Turín is a municipality in the Ahuachapán department of El Salvador.

Geography
The town is located 4 km west of Atiquizaya, 10 km east of Ahuachapán, the department capital; and 12 km west of Chalchuapa and the neighboring Maya archeological site of Tazumal. It is crossed by the national highway CA 13 and by the Santa Ana-Ahuachapán railway line.

Notable people
Lilian Mercedes Letona (Commander Clelia, 1954–1983), guerrilla and revolutionary, member of the FMLN

References

External links

Municipalities of the Ahuachapán Department